Podippalam is a village in Kasaragod district in the state of Kerala, India.

Location
It is situated approximately 6 km inland from the coastal town of Bekal. podippalam is around 17 km by road from Kasaragod and around 16 km from Kanhangad.

Education
Sri Mahalingeshwara Aided Upper Primary School and the Sri Mahalingeshwara Shiva temple are located near by podippalam Village.

Temples
Panayal kottappara sree Vayanattu kulavan dhevasthanm located here.

Transportation
Local roads have access to NH.66 which connects to Mangalore in the north and Calicut in the south. The nearest railway station is Kanhangad on Mangalore-Palakkad line. There are airports at Mangalore and Calicut.
Coordinates:   12°24'53"N   75°3'5"E

References

Kanhangad area